First Edition is a 1981 album by the jazz pianist George Shearing and the guitarist Jim Hall.

Reception

Scott Yanow reviewed the album for Allmusic describing it as a "tasteful set" and that the music "challenge[d] the pair and their quiet and subtle styles match together well", concluding that it was an "interesting and somewhat unexpected musical collaboration".

Track listing 
"Street of Dreams" (Sam M. Lewis, Victor Young) – 4:06
"To Antonio Carlos Jobim" (George Shearing) –3:15
"Careful" (Jim Hall) – 5:54
"I See Nothing to Laugh About" (Marvin Fisher) – 5:09
"Without Words" (Hall) – 5:03
"I Hear a Rhapsody" (Jack Baker, George Fragos, Dick Gasparre) – 3:41
"To Tommy Flanagan" (Shearing) – 5:10
"Emily" (Johnny Mandel, Johnny Mercer)–5:52

Personnel 
George Shearing – piano
Jim Hall – guitar
Production
Phil Edwards – engineer, mixing
Ira Gitler – liner notes
George Horn – mastering
Carl Jefferson – producer
Dick Hendler – art direction
Bruce Burr – cover photo, photography

References 

1981 albums
Albums produced by Carl Jefferson
George Shearing albums
Jim Hall (musician) albums
Instrumental duet albums
Collaborative albums
Concord Records albums